Lee Robinson is the name of:

Lee Robinson (American football) (born 1987), American football linebacker
Lee Robinson (footballer) (born 1986), English goalkeeper for Dunfermline Athletic
Lee Robinson (politician) (1943–2015), American politician, former Mayor of Macon, Georgia
Lee Robinson (rugby union) (born 1980)
Lee Robinson (director) (1923–2003), Australian director